Dhool Ka Phool is a 1959 Indian Hindi-language film produced by B. R. Chopra and directed by B. R.'s brother Yash Chopra, being his first movie as a director, having been an assistant director in B. R.'s earlier film Naya Daur. The film stars Rajendra Kumar, Mala Sinha, Nanda, Leela Chitnis, Jeevan, Manmohan Krishna, and Ashok Kumar. The story revolves around a Muslim man bringing up an "illegitimate" Hindu child and featured the classic song Too Hindu Banega Na Musalman Banega, Insaan Ki Aulaad Hai, Insaan Banega on Manmohan Krishna, who also won the Filmfare Award for Best Supporting Actor for his role as Abdul Rasheed. Besides that, Sinha received a nomination for Best Actress and Mukhram Sharma for Best Story. The movie was remade in Telugu as Jeevana Teeralu.

In the next film, Dharmputra (1961), about Hindu fundamentalism, Chopra reversed the theme, as therein a Hindu family brings up an illegitimate Muslim child.

Cast
Rajendra Kumar as Mahesh Kapoor
Mala Sinha as Meena Khosla 
Nanda as Malti Rai / Malti Kapoor 
Manmohan Krishna as Abdul Rashid
Leela Chitnis as Gangu Dai
Mohan Choti as Jaggu
Jagdish Raj as Prosecuting Attorney
Ashok Kumar as Defence Lawyer
Sushil Kumar as Roshan
Daisy Irani as Ramesh
Narbada Shankar as Pandit
R.P. Kapoor
Ravikant as Mahesh"s father
Uma Datt

Story
Meena (Mala Sinha) and Mahesh (Rajendra Kumar) are madly in love with each other. One day, both of them get carried away and Meena becomes pregnant. On the other hand, Mahesh marries Malti Rai (Nanda), who belongs to a good family. Meena gives birth to a little boy and takes the baby to his father, Mahesh Kapoor. Mahesh disowns both of them, saying that it was his mistake.

Meena leaves the five-month-old baby boy in a dark forest, where a snake guards his life. On the way back from the city, Abdul Rasheed (Manmohan Krishna) sees the child and protects him. Abdul also gets disowned by society because the baby is illegitimate and nobody knows about the parents and religion. In spite of all the odds, Abdul fights with the entire society and raises the child wholeheartedly. He names him Roshan(Master Sushil Kumar)

On the other hand, Meena starts working as assistant to a lawyer, Ashok Kumar (Ashok Kumar). Ashok Kumar starts developing a soft spot for her. They both get married without Meena revealing her past. Mahesh is now a judge and is blessed with a baby boy Ramesh(Daisy Irani). One fine day, both Meena's son Roshan (raised by Abdul) and Mahesh's son Ramesh meet each other in school with their respective parents. In the presence of Mahesh, Abdul tells the principal of the school that he found Roshan in a forest eight years ago.

In school, Roshan and Ramesh become close to each other. They become the best of friends. When other kids make fun of Roshan, the Ramesh supports him. One day, he takes Roshan to his home, where his mother Malti welcomes him with love and affection, but Mahesh throws the boy out of his house, saying that he is not worth our respect and love, as he is illegitimate.

After all this, Roshan gets depressed and falls into bad company. But Ramesh tries to stop him and dies in a car accident. This leaves Roshan under more depression. He gets involved in a theft, but he is innocent. The case comes into the court of judge Mahesh Kapoor. Abdul goes to Ashok Kumar to fight this case, as he is a lawyer. He tells Ashok, in front of his wife Meena, as to who actually is the mother of Roshan, and that when and under what circumstances he found Roshan. She immediately recognizes Roshan as her son. She testifies in his favour, in the court. Mahesh, recognizing Meena and the son, admits his fault.

Next day, Malti tells Mahesh to go to Abdul's house and bring Roshan, since he is his son. On the other hand, Meena is ready to leave the house sneakingly, but Ashok stops her, saying that he respects her even more now. She can bring the child home. Both Meena and Mahesh go to Abdul's house to ask for Roshan. He first says no, but after that, he gives Roshan to Meena and Ashok Kumar.

Soundtrack
All lyrics provided by Sahir Ludhianvi & music by N. Datta.

Box office
The film grossed 1 crore and was declared as a "Super Hit" by the box office.

Awards and nominations

|-
| rowspan="3"|1960
| Manmohan Krishna
| Filmfare Award for Best Supporting Actor
| 
|-
| Mala Sinha
| Filmfare Award for Best Actress
| 
|-
| Mukhram Sharma
| Filmfare Award for Best Story
| 
|}

References

External links 
 
 Dhool Ka Phool (1959) on YouTube

1959 films
1950s Hindi-language films
Indian romantic drama films
Films directed by Yash Chopra
Hindi films remade in other languages
Films scored by Datta Naik
1959 directorial debut films